Cherven Bryag is a town in northern Bulgaria, a capital of the Cherven Bryag municipality, Pleven Province.   It is situated on the right shore of the Zlatna Panega in river Iskar, 137 km north-east of Sofia, 53 km south-west of Pleven, 12 km north-west of Lukovit, 56 km east of Vratsa, and 55 km south of Oryahovo.  The name means "red shore" and refers to the reddish clay in the vicinity of the river. As of December 2009, the town had a population of 13,856 inhabitants.

Cherven Bryag is a medieval settlement mentioned in 1431 in Ottoman registers as Dobrolak. Under its present name Cherven Bryag was first recorded in the 16th century as part of the Ottoman region of Nikopol. On 26 June 1929, Prime Minister Andrey Lyapchev proclaimed the former village and station a town.

Cherven Bryag is a railway station on the line Sofia-Gorna Oryahovitsa-Varna/Ruse. It first appeared as a railway station settlement in 1899 on the newly built Sofia-Varna railway line.  Cherven Bryag was a starting point of a narrow-gauge railway line to Byala Slatina and Oryahovo, as well as of a normal railway line to Lukovit and Zlatna Panega. Today those lines are no more, out of service. The railway station is in the southwestern end of the town, opposite the central area.

Among the local landmarks, the St. Sophronius of Vratsa Church located in the central part of the town is notable.

Notable people 
 Margarita Lilowa (1935–2012), Austrian opera singer
 Daniel Pavlov (born 1967), athlete
 Lyubomir Neikov (born 1972), actor and comedian

Gallery

References

External links
 Official website of Cherven Bryag municipality

Towns in Bulgaria
Populated places in Pleven Province